The women's 400 metres hurdles event at the 1991 Pan American Games was held in Havana, Cuba on 8 and 10 August.

Medalists

Results

Heats

Final

References

Athletics at the 1991 Pan American Games
1991
Pan